Selenium is a chemical element with the symbol Se and atomic number 34. It is a nonmetal (more rarely considered a metalloid) with properties that are intermediate between the elements above and below in the periodic table, sulfur and tellurium, and also has similarities to arsenic. It seldom occurs in its elemental state or as pure ore compounds in the Earth's crust.

Selenium is found in metal sulfide ores, where it partially replaces the sulfur. Commercially, selenium is produced as a byproduct in the refining of these ores, most often during production. Minerals that are pure selenide or selenate compounds are known but rare. The chief commercial uses for selenium today are glassmaking and pigments. Selenium is a semiconductor and is used in photocells. Applications in electronics, once important, have been mostly replaced with silicon semiconductor devices. Selenium is still used in a few types of DC power surge protectors and one type of fluorescent quantum dot.

Although trace amounts of selenium are necessary for cellular function in many animals, including humans, both elemental selenium and (especially) selenium salts are toxic in even small doses, causing selenosis. Selenium is listed as an ingredient in many multivitamins and other dietary supplements, as well as in infant formula, and is a component of the antioxidant enzymes glutathione peroxidase and thioredoxin reductase (which indirectly reduce certain oxidized molecules in animals and some plants) as well as in 3 deiodinase enzymes. Selenium requirements in plants differ by species, with some plants requiring relatively large amounts and others apparently not requiring any.

Characteristics

Physical properties

Selenium forms several allotropes that interconvert with temperature changes, depending somewhat on the rate of temperature change. When prepared in chemical reactions, selenium is usually an amorphous, brick-red powder. When rapidly melted, it forms the black, vitreous form, usually sold commercially as beads. The structure of black selenium is irregular and complex and consists of polymeric rings with up to 1000 atoms per ring. Black Se is a brittle, lustrous solid that is slightly soluble in CS2. Upon heating, it softens at 50 °C and converts to gray selenium at 180 °C; the transformation temperature is reduced by presence of halogens and amines.

The red α, β, and γ forms are produced from solutions of black selenium by varying the evaporation rate of the solvent (usually CS2). They all have a relatively low, monoclinic crystal symmetry (space group 14) and contain nearly identical puckered cyclooctaselenium (Se8) rings with different geometric arrangements, as in sulfur. The eight atoms of a ring are not equivalent (i.e. they are not mapped one onto another by any symmetry operation), and in fact in the γ-monoclinic form, half the rings are in one configuration (and its mirror image) and half in another. The packing is most dense in the α form. In the Se8 rings, the Se-Se distance varies depending on where the pair of atoms is in the ring, but the average is 233.5 pm, and the Se-Se-Se angle is on average 105.7° . Other selenium allotropes may contain Se6 or Se7 rings.

The most stable and dense form of selenium is gray and has a chiral hexagonal crystal lattice (space group 152 or 154 depending on the chirality) consisting of helical polymeric chains, where the Se-Se distance is 237.3 pm and Se-Se-Se angle is 103.1° . The minimum distance between chains is 343.6 pm. Gray Se is formed by mild heating of other allotropes, by slow cooling of molten Se, or by condensing Se vapor just below the melting point. Whereas other Se forms are insulators, gray Se is a semiconductor showing appreciable photoconductivity. Unlike the other allotropes, it is insoluble in CS2. It resists oxidation by air and is not attacked by nonoxidizing acids. With strong reducing agents, it forms polyselenides. Selenium does not exhibit the changes in viscosity that sulfur undergoes when gradually heated.

Optical properties 

Owing to its use as a photoconductor in flat-panel x-ray detectors (see below), the optical properties of amorphous selenium (α-Se) thin films have been the subject of intense research.

Isotopes 

Selenium has seven naturally occurring isotopes. Five of these, 74Se, 76Se, 77Se, 78Se, 80Se, are stable, with 80Se being the most abundant (49.6% natural abundance). Also naturally occurring is the long-lived primordial radionuclide 82Se, with a half-life of 9.2×1019 years. The non-primordial radioisotope 79Se also occurs in minute quantities in uranium ores as a product of nuclear fission. Selenium also has numerous unstable synthetic isotopes ranging from 64Se to 95Se; the most stable are 75Se with a half-life of 119.78 days and 72Se with a half-life of 8.4 days. Isotopes lighter than the stable isotopes primarily undergo beta plus decay to isotopes of arsenic, and isotopes heavier than the stable isotopes undergo beta minus decay to isotopes of bromine, with some minor neutron emission branches in the heaviest known isotopes.

Chemical compounds

Selenium compounds commonly exist in the oxidation states −2, +2, +4, and +6.

Chalcogen compounds

Selenium forms two oxides: selenium dioxide (SeO2) and selenium trioxide (SeO3). Selenium dioxide is formed by the reaction of elemental selenium with oxygen:
Se8 + 8 O2 -> 8 SeO2
It is a polymeric solid that forms monomeric SeO2 molecules in the gas phase. It dissolves in water to form selenous acid, H2SeO3. Selenous acid can also be made directly by oxidizing elemental selenium with nitric acid:

3 Se + 4 HNO3 + H2O -> 3 H2SeO3 + 4 NO
Unlike sulfur, which forms a stable trioxide, selenium trioxide is thermodynamically unstable and decomposes to the dioxide above 185 °C:

2 SeO3 -> 2 SeO2 + O2 (ΔH = −54 kJ/mol)
Selenium trioxide is produced in the laboratory by the reaction of anhydrous potassium selenate (K2SeO4) and sulfur trioxide (SO3).

Salts of selenous acid are called selenites. These include silver selenite (Ag2SeO3) and sodium selenite (Na2SeO3).

Hydrogen sulfide reacts with aqueous selenous acid to produce selenium disulfide:
H2SeO3 + 2 H2S -> SeS2 + 3 H2O

Selenium disulfide consists of 8-membered rings. It has an approximate composition of SeS2, with individual rings varying in composition, such as Se4S4 and Se2S6. Selenium disulfide has been used in shampoo as an antidandruff agent, an inhibitor in polymer chemistry, a glass dye, and a reducing agent in fireworks.

Selenium trioxide may be synthesized by dehydrating selenic acid, H2SeO4, which is itself produced by the oxidation of selenium dioxide with hydrogen peroxide:
SeO2 + H2O2 -> H2SeO4

Hot, concentrated selenic acid can react with gold to form gold(III) selenate.

Halogen compounds
Iodides of selenium are not well known. The only stable chloride is selenium monochloride (Se2Cl2), which might be better known as selenium(I) chloride; the corresponding bromide is also known. These species are structurally analogous to the corresponding disulfur dichloride. Selenium dichloride is an important reagent in the preparation of selenium compounds (e.g. the preparation of Se7). It is prepared by treating selenium with sulfuryl chloride (SO2Cl2). Selenium reacts with fluorine to form selenium hexafluoride:
Se8 + 24 F2 -> 8 SeF6

In comparison with its sulfur counterpart (sulfur hexafluoride), selenium hexafluoride (SeF6) is more reactive and is a toxic pulmonary irritant.
Some of the selenium oxyhalides, such as seleninyl fluoride (SeOF2) and selenium oxychloride (SeOCl2) have been used as specialty solvents.

Selenides
Analogous to the behavior of other chalcogens, selenium forms hydrogen selenide, H2Se. It is a strongly odiferous, toxic, and colorless gas. It is more acidic than H2S. In solution it ionizes to HSe−. The selenide dianion Se2− forms a variety of compounds, including the minerals from which selenium is obtained commercially. Illustrative selenides include mercury selenide (HgSe), lead selenide (PbSe), zinc selenide (ZnSe), and copper indium gallium diselenide (Cu(Ga,In)Se2). These materials are semiconductors. With highly electropositive metals, such as aluminium, these selenides are prone to hydrolysis:
Al2Se3 + 3 H2O -> Al2O3 + 3 H2Se
Alkali metal selenides react with selenium to form polyselenides, which exist as chains.

Other compounds
Tetraselenium tetranitride, Se4N4, is an explosive orange compound analogous to tetrasulfur tetranitride (S4N4).

Selenium reacts with cyanides to yield selenocyanates:
8 KCN + Se8 -> 8 KSeCN

Organoselenium compounds

Selenium, especially in the II oxidation state, forms stable bonds to carbon, which are structurally analogous to the corresponding organosulfur compounds. Especially common are selenides (R2Se, analogues of thioethers), diselenides (R2Se2, analogues of disulfides), and selenols (RSeH, analogues of thiols). Representatives of selenides, diselenides, and selenols include respectively selenomethionine, diphenyldiselenide, and benzeneselenol. The sulfoxide in sulfur chemistry is represented in selenium chemistry by the selenoxides (formula RSe(O)R), which are intermediates in organic synthesis, as illustrated by the selenoxide elimination reaction. Consistent with trends indicated by the double bond rule, selenoketones, R(C=Se)R, and selenaldehydes, R(C=Se)H, are rarely observed.

History 
Selenium (Greek σελήνη selene meaning "Moon") was discovered in 1817 by Jöns Jacob Berzelius and Johan Gottlieb Gahn. Both chemists owned a chemistry plant near Gripsholm, Sweden, producing sulfuric acid by the lead chamber process. The pyrite from the Falun Mine created a red precipitate in the lead chambers which was presumed to be an arsenic compound, so the pyrite's use to make acid was discontinued. Berzelius and Gahn wanted to use the pyrite and they also observed that the red precipitate gave off a smell like horseradish when burned. This smell was not typical of arsenic, but a similar odor was known from tellurium compounds. Hence, Berzelius's first letter to Alexander Marcet stated that this was a tellurium compound. However, the lack of tellurium compounds in the Falun Mine minerals eventually led Berzelius to reanalyze the red precipitate, and in 1818 he wrote a second letter to Marcet describing a newly found element similar to sulfur and tellurium. Because of its similarity to tellurium, named for the Earth, Berzelius named the new element after the Moon.

In 1873, Willoughby Smith found that the electrical resistance of grey selenium was dependent on the ambient light. This led to its use as a cell for sensing light. The first commercial products using selenium were developed by Werner Siemens in the mid-1870s. The selenium cell was used in the photophone developed by Alexander Graham Bell in 1879. Selenium transmits an electric current proportional to the amount of light falling on its surface. This phenomenon was used in the design of light meters and similar devices. Selenium's semiconductor properties found numerous other applications in electronics. The development of selenium rectifiers began during the early 1930s, and these replaced copper oxide rectifiers because they were more efficient. These lasted in commercial applications until the 1970s, following which they were replaced with less expensive and even more efficient silicon rectifiers.

Selenium came to medical notice later because of its toxicity to industrial workers. Selenium was also recognized as an important veterinary toxin, which is seen in animals that have eaten high-selenium plants. In 1954, the first hints of specific biological functions of selenium were discovered in microorganisms by biochemist, Jane Pinsent. It was discovered to be essential for mammalian life in 1957. In the 1970s, it was shown to be present in two independent sets of enzymes. This was followed by the discovery of selenocysteine in proteins. During the 1980s, selenocysteine was shown to be encoded by the codon UGA. The recoding mechanism was worked out first in bacteria and then in mammals (see SECIS element).

Occurrence 

Native (i.e., elemental) selenium is a rare mineral, which does not usually form good crystals, but, when it does, they are steep rhombohedra or tiny acicular (hair-like) crystals. Isolation of selenium is often complicated by the presence of other compounds and elements.

Selenium occurs naturally in a number of inorganic forms, including selenide, selenate, and selenite, but these minerals are rare. The common mineral selenite is not a selenium mineral, and contains no selenite ion, but is rather a type of gypsum (calcium sulfate hydrate) named like selenium for the moon well before the discovery of selenium. Selenium is most commonly found as an impurity, replacing a small part of the sulfur in sulfide ores of many metals.

In living systems, selenium is found in the amino acids selenomethionine, selenocysteine, and methylselenocysteine. In these compounds, selenium plays a role analogous to that of sulfur. Another naturally occurring organoselenium compound is dimethyl selenide.

Certain soils are selenium-rich, and selenium can be bioconcentrated by some plants. In soils, selenium most often occurs in soluble forms such as selenate (analogous to sulfate), which are leached into rivers very easily by runoff. Ocean water contains significant amounts of selenium.

Typical background concentrations of selenium do not exceed 1 ng/m3 in the atmosphere; 1 mg/kg in soil and vegetation and 0.5 μg/L in freshwater and seawater.

Anthropogenic sources of selenium include coal burning, and the mining and smelting of sulfide ores.

Production
Selenium is most commonly produced from selenide in many sulfide ores, such as those of copper, nickel, or lead. Electrolytic metal refining is particularly productive of selenium as a byproduct, obtained from the anode mud of copper refineries. Another source was the mud from the lead chambers of sulfuric acid plants, a process that is no longer used. Selenium can be refined from these muds by a number of methods. However, most elemental selenium comes as a byproduct of refining copper or producing sulfuric acid. Since its invention, solvent extraction and electrowinning (SX/EW) production of copper produces an increasing share of the worldwide copper supply. This changes the availability of selenium because only a comparably small part of the selenium in the ore is leached with the copper.

Industrial production of selenium usually involves the extraction of selenium dioxide from residues obtained during the purification of copper. Common production from the residue then begins by oxidation with sodium carbonate to produce selenium dioxide, which is mixed with water and acidified to form selenous acid (oxidation step). Selenous acid is bubbled with sulfur dioxide (reduction step) to give elemental selenium.

About 2,000 tonnes of selenium were produced in 2011 worldwide, mostly in Germany (650 t), Japan (630 t), Belgium (200 t), and Russia (140 t), and the total reserves were estimated at 93,000 tonnes. These data exclude two major producers: the United States and China. A previous sharp increase was observed in 2004 from $4–$5 to $27/lb. The price was relatively stable during 2004–2010 at about US$30 per pound (in 100 pound lots) but increased to $65/lb in 2011. The consumption in 2010 was divided as follows: metallurgy – 30%, glass manufacturing – 30%, agriculture – 10%, chemicals and pigments – 10%, and electronics – 10%. China is the dominant consumer of selenium at 1,500–2,000 tonnes/year.

Applications

Fertilizers

Researchers found that application of selenium fertilizer to lettuce crops decreased the accumulation of lead and cadmium. Peaches and pears given a foliar selenium spray contained higher levels of selenium and also stayed firm and ripe longer when in storage. In low doses, selenium has shown a beneficial effect on plant resistance to various environmental stress factors including drought, UV-B, soil salinity, and cold or hot temperatures. However, it can damage plants at higher doses.

Manganese electrolysis 
During the electrowinning of manganese, the addition of selenium dioxide decreases the power necessary to operate the electrolysis cells. China is the largest consumer of selenium dioxide for this purpose. For every tonne of manganese, an average 2 kg selenium oxide is used.

Glass production
The largest commercial use of Se, accounting for about 50% of consumption, is for the production of glass. Se compounds confer a red color to glass. This color cancels out the green or yellow tints that arise from iron impurities typical for most glass. For this purpose, various selenite and selenate salts are added. For other applications, a red color may be desired, produced by mixtures of CdSe and CdS.

Alloys
Selenium is used with bismuth in brasses to replace more toxic lead. The regulation of lead in drinking water applications such as in the US with the Safe Drinking Water Act of 1974, made a reduction of lead in brass necessary. The new brass is marketed under the name EnviroBrass. Like lead and sulfur, selenium improves the machinability of steel at concentrations around 0.15%. Selenium produces the same machinability improvement in copper alloys.

Lithium–selenium batteries 

The lithium–selenium (Li–Se) battery is one of the most promising systems for energy storage in the family of lithium batteries. The Li–Se battery is an alternative to the lithium–sulfur battery, with an advantage of high electrical conductivity.

Solar cells
Selenium was the basis of the very first solar cells, with the first example of rooftop solar being a selenium cell from 1884. Such cells were later used in battery-free light meters for photography. Copper indium gallium selenide is a material used in solar cells.

Photoconductors 
Amorphous selenium (α-Se) thin films have found application as photoconductors in flat panel x-ray detectors. These detectors use amorphous selenium to capture and convert incident x-ray photons directly into electric charge.

Rectifiers 
Selenium rectifiers were first used in 1933. Their use continued into the 1990s.

Other uses
Small amounts of organoselenium compounds have been used to modify the catalysts used for the vulcanization for the production of rubber.

The demand for selenium by the electronics industry is declining. Its photovoltaic and photoconductive properties are still useful in photocopying, photocells, light meters and solar cells. Its use as a photoconductor in plain-paper copiers once was a leading application, but in the 1980s, the photoconductor application declined (although it was still a large end-use) as more and more copiers switched to organic photoconductors. Though once widely used, selenium rectifiers have mostly been replaced (or are being replaced) by silicon-based devices. The most notable exception is in power DC surge protection, where the superior energy capabilities of selenium suppressors make them more desirable than metal-oxide varistors.

Zinc selenide was the first material for blue LEDs, but gallium nitride dominates that market. Cadmium selenide was an important component in quantum dots. Sheets of amorphous selenium convert X-ray images to patterns of charge in xeroradiography and in solid-state, flat-panel X-ray cameras. Ionized selenium (Se+24) is one of the active mediums used in X-ray lasers.

Selenium is a catalyst in some chemical reactions, but it is not widely used because of issues with toxicity. In X-ray crystallography, incorporation of one or more selenium atoms in place of sulfur helps with multiple-wavelength anomalous dispersion and single wavelength anomalous dispersion phasing.

Selenium is used in the toning of photographic prints, and it is sold as a toner by numerous photographic manufacturers. Selenium intensifies and extends the tonal range of black-and-white photographic images and improves the permanence of prints.

75Se is used as a gamma source in industrial radiography.

Pollution

In high concentrations, selenium acts as an environmental contaminant. Sources of pollution include waste materials from certain mining, agricultural, petrochemical, and industrial manufacturing operations.  In Belews Lake North Carolina, 19 species of fish were eliminated from the lake due to 150–200 μg Se/L wastewater discharged from 1974 to 1986 from a Duke Energy coal-fired power plant. At the Kesterson National Wildlife Refuge in California, thousands of fish and waterbirds were poisoned by selenium in agricultural irrigation drainage.

Selenium pollution might impact some aquatic systems and may be caused by anthropogenic factors such as farming runoff and industrial processes. People who eat more fish are generally healthier than those who eat less, which suggests no major human health concern from selenium pollution, although selenium has a potential effect on humans.

Substantial physiological changes may occur in fish with high tissue concentrations of selenium. Fish affected by selenium may experience swelling of the gill lamellae, which impedes oxygen diffusion across the gills and blood flow within the gills. Respiratory capacity is further reduced due to selenium binding to hemoglobin. Other problems include degeneration of liver tissue, swelling around the heart, damaged egg follicles in ovaries, cataracts, and accumulation of fluid in the body cavity and head. Selenium often causes a malformed fish fetus which may have problems feeding or respiring; distortion of the fins or spine is also common. Adult fish may appear healthy despite their inability to produce viable offspring.

Selenium is bioaccumulated in aquatic habitats, which results in higher concentrations in organisms than the surrounding water. Organoselenium compounds can be concentrated over 200,000 times by zooplankton when water concentrations are in the 0.5 to 0.8 μg Se/L range. Inorganic selenium bioaccumulates more readily in phytoplankton than zooplankton. Phytoplankton can concentrate inorganic selenium by a factor of 3000. Further concentration through bioaccumulation occurs along the food chain, as predators consume selenium-rich prey. It is recommended that a water concentration of 2 μg Se/L be considered highly hazardous to sensitive fish and aquatic birds. Selenium poisoning can be passed from parents to offspring through the egg, and selenium poisoning may persist for many generations. Reproduction of mallard ducks is impaired at dietary concentrations of 7 μg Se/L. Many benthic invertebrates can tolerate selenium concentrations up to 300 μg/L of Se in their diet.

Bioaccumulation of selenium in aquatic environments causes fish kills depending on the species in the affected area. There are, however, a few species that have been seen to survive these events and tolerate the increased selenium. It has also been suggested that season could have an impact on the harmful effects of selenium on fish.

Selenium poisoning of water systems may result whenever new agricultural run-off courses through dry lands. This process leaches natural soluble selenium compounds (such as selenates) into the water, which may then be concentrated in wetlands as the water evaporates. Selenium pollution of waterways also occurs when selenium is leached from coal flue ash, mining and metal smelting, crude oil processing, and landfill. High selenium levels in waterways were found to cause congenital disorders in oviparous species, including wetland birds and fish. Elevated dietary methylmercury levels can amplify the harm of selenium toxicity in oviparous species.

Biological role

Although it is toxic in large doses, selenium is an essential micronutrient for animals. In plants, it occurs as a bystander mineral, sometimes in toxic proportions in forage (some plants may accumulate selenium as a defense against being eaten by animals, but other plants, such as locoweed, require selenium, and their growth indicates the presence of selenium in soil).

Selenium is a component of the unusual amino acids selenocysteine and selenomethionine. In humans, selenium is a trace element nutrient that functions as cofactor for reduction of antioxidant enzymes, such as glutathione peroxidases and certain forms of thioredoxin reductase found in animals and some plants (this enzyme occurs in all living organisms, but not all forms of it in plants require selenium).

The glutathione peroxidase family of enzymes (GSH-Px) catalyze certain reactions that remove reactive oxygen species such as hydrogen peroxide and organic hydroperoxides:

2 GSH + H2O2----GSH-Px → GSSG + 2 H2O

The thyroid gland and every cell that uses thyroid hormone use selenium, which is a cofactor for the three of the four known types of thyroid hormone deiodinases, which activate and then deactivate various thyroid hormones and their metabolites; the iodothyronine deiodinases are the subfamily of deiodinase enzymes that use selenium as the otherwise rare amino acid selenocysteine. (Only the deiodinase iodotyrosine deiodinase, which works on the last breakdown products of thyroid hormone, does not use selenium.)

Selenium may inhibit Hashimoto's disease, in which the body's own thyroid cells are attacked as foreign. A reduction of 21% on TPO antibodies is reported with the dietary intake of 0.2 mg of selenium.

Increased dietary selenium reduces the effects of mercury toxicity, although it is effective only at low to modest doses of mercury. Evidence suggests that the molecular mechanisms of mercury toxicity includes the irreversible inhibition of selenoenzymes that are required to prevent and reverse oxidative damage in brain and endocrine tissues. An antioxidant, selenoneine, which is derived from selenium and has been found to be present in the blood of bluefin tuna, is the subject of scientific research regarding its possible roles in inflammatory and chronic diseases, methylmercury detoxification, and oxidative damages. It seems as though when mercury levels in a marine fish rise, so do the selenium levels. To the knowledge of researchers, there are no reports of mercury levels exceeding that of selenium levels in ocean fish.

Evolution in biology

From about three billion years ago, prokaryotic selenoprotein families drive the evolution of selenocysteine, an amino acid. Selenium is incorporated into several prokaryotic selenoprotein families in bacteria, archaea, and eukaryotes as selenocysteine, where selenoprotein peroxiredoxins protect bacterial and eukaryotic cells against oxidative damage. Selenoprotein families of GSH-Px and the deiodinases of eukaryotic cells seem to have a bacterial phylogenetic origin. The selenocysteine-containing form occurs in species as diverse as green algae, diatoms, sea urchins, fish, and chickens. Selenium enzymes are involved in the small reducing molecules glutathione and thioredoxin. One family of selenium-bearing molecules (the glutathione peroxidases) destroys peroxide and repairs damaged peroxidized cell membranes, using glutathione. Another selenium-bearing enzyme in some plants and in animals (thioredoxin reductase) generates reduced thioredoxin, a dithiol that serves as an electron source for peroxidases and also the important reducing enzyme ribonucleotide reductase that makes DNA precursors from RNA precursors.

Trace elements involved in GSH-Px and superoxide dismutase enzymes activities, i.e. selenium, vanadium, magnesium, copper, and zinc, may have been lacking in some terrestrial mineral-deficient areas. Marine organisms retained and sometimes expanded their selenoproteomes, whereas the selenoproteomes of some terrestrial organisms were reduced or completely lost. These findings suggest that, with the exception of vertebrates, aquatic life supports selenium use, whereas terrestrial habitats lead to reduced use of this trace element. Marine fishes and vertebrate thyroid glands have the highest concentration of selenium and iodine. From about 500 million years ago, freshwater and terrestrial plants slowly optimized the production of "new" endogenous antioxidants such as ascorbic acid (vitamin C), polyphenols (including flavonoids), tocopherols, etc. A few of these appeared more recently, in the last 50–200 million years, in fruits and flowers of angiosperm plants. In fact, the angiosperms (the dominant type of plant today) and most of their antioxidant pigments evolved during the late Jurassic period.

The deiodinase isoenzymes constitute another family of eukaryotic selenoproteins with identified enzyme function. Deiodinases are able to extract electrons from iodides, and iodides from iodothyronines. They are, thus, involved in thyroid-hormone regulation, participating in the protection of thyrocytes from damage by H2O2 produced for thyroid-hormone biosynthesis. About 200 million years ago, new selenoproteins were developed as mammalian GSH-Px enzymes.

Nutritional sources of selenium
Dietary selenium comes from meat, nuts, cereals and mushrooms. Brazil nuts are the richest dietary source (though this is soil-dependent, since the Brazil nut does not require high levels of the element for its own needs).

The US Recommended Dietary Allowance (RDA) of selenium for teenagers and adults is 55 µg/day. Selenium as a dietary supplement is available in many forms, including multi-vitamins/mineral supplements, which typically contain 55 or 70 µg/serving. Selenium-specific supplements typically contain either 100 or 200 µg/serving.

In June 2015, the US Food and Drug Administration (FDA) published its final rule establishing the requirement of minimum and maximum levels of selenium in infant formula.

The selenium content in the human body is believed to be in the 13–20 mg range.

Indicator plant species
Certain species of plants are considered indicators of high selenium content of the soil because they require high levels of selenium to thrive. The main selenium indicator plants are Astragalus species (including some locoweeds), prince's plume (Stanleya sp.), woody asters (Xylorhiza sp.), and false goldenweed (Oonopsis sp.)

Detection in biological fluids
Selenium may be measured in blood, plasma, serum, or urine to monitor excessive environmental or occupational exposure, to confirm a diagnosis of poisoning in hospitalized victims, or investigate a suspected case of fatal overdose. Some analytical techniques are capable of distinguishing organic from inorganic forms of the element. Both organic and inorganic forms of selenium are largely converted to monosaccharide conjugates (selenosugars) in the body prior to elimination in the urine. Cancer patients receiving daily oral doses of selenothionine may achieve very high plasma and urine selenium concentrations.

Toxicity

Although selenium is an essential trace element, it is toxic if taken in excess. Exceeding the Tolerable Upper Intake Level of 400 micrograms per day can lead to selenosis. This 400 µg Tolerable Upper Intake Level is based primarily on a 1986 study of five Chinese patients who exhibited overt signs of selenosis and a follow up study on the same five people in 1992. The 1992 study actually found the maximum safe dietary Se intake to be approximately 800 micrograms per day (15 micrograms per kilogram body weight), but suggested 400 micrograms per day to avoid creating an imbalance of nutrients in the diet and to accord with data from other countries. In China, people who ingested corn grown in extremely selenium-rich stony coal (carbonaceous shale) have suffered from selenium toxicity. This coal was shown to have selenium content as high as 9.1%, the highest concentration in coal ever recorded.

Signs and symptoms of selenosis include a garlic odor on the breath, gastrointestinal disorders, hair loss, sloughing of nails, fatigue, irritability, and neurological damage. Extreme cases of selenosis can exhibit cirrhosis of the liver, pulmonary edema, or death. Elemental selenium and most metallic selenides have relatively low toxicities because of low bioavailability. By contrast, selenates and selenites have an oxidant mode of action similar to that of arsenic trioxide and are very toxic. The chronic toxic dose of selenite for humans is about 2400 to 3000 micrograms of selenium per day. Hydrogen selenide is an extremely toxic, corrosive gas. Selenium also occurs in organic compounds, such as dimethyl selenide, selenomethionine, selenocysteine and methylselenocysteine, all of which have high bioavailability and are toxic in large doses.

On 19 April 2009, 21 polo ponies died shortly before a match in the United States Polo Open. Three days later, a pharmacy released a statement explaining that the horses had received an incorrect dose of one of the ingredients used in a vitamin/mineral supplement compound that had been incorrectly prepared by a compounding pharmacy. Analysis of blood levels of inorganic compounds in the supplement indicated the selenium concentrations were 10 to 15 times higher than normal in the blood samples, and 15 to 20 times higher than normal in the liver samples. Selenium was later confirmed to be the toxic factor.

In fish and other wildlife, selenium is necessary for life, but toxic in high doses. For salmon, the optimal concentration of selenium is about 1 microgram selenium per gram of whole body weight. Much below that level, young salmon die from deficiency; much above, they die from toxic excess.

The Occupational Safety and Health Administration (OSHA) has set the legal limit (permissible exposure limit) for selenium in the workplace at 0.2 mg/m3 over an 8-hour workday. The National Institute for Occupational Safety and Health (NIOSH) has set a Recommended exposure limit (REL) of 0.2 mg/m3 over an 8-hour workday. At levels of 1 mg/m3, selenium is immediately dangerous to life and health.

Deficiency

Selenium deficiency can occur in patients with severely compromised intestinal function, those undergoing total parenteral nutrition, and in those of advanced age (over 90). Also, people dependent on food grown from selenium-deficient soil are at risk. Although New Zealand soil has low levels of selenium, adverse health effects have not been detected in the residents.

Selenium deficiency, defined by low (<60% of normal) selenoenzyme activity levels in brain and endocrine tissues, occurs only when a low selenium level is linked with an additional stress, such as high exposures to mercury or increased oxidant stress from vitamin E deficiency.

Selenium interacts with other nutrients, such as iodine and vitamin E. The effect of selenium deficiency on health remains uncertain, particularly in relation to Kashin-Beck disease. Also, selenium interacts with other minerals, such as zinc and copper. High doses of Se supplements in pregnant animals might disturb the Zn:Cu ratio and lead to Zn reduction; in such treatment cases, Zn levels should be monitored. Further studies are needed to confirm these interactions.

In the regions (e.g. various regions within North America) where low selenium soil levels lead to low concentrations in the plants, some animal species may be deficient unless selenium is supplemented with diet or injection. Ruminants are particularly susceptible. In general, absorption of dietary selenium is lower in ruminants than other animals, and is lower from forages than from grain. Ruminants grazing certain forages, e.g., some white clover varieties containing cyanogenic glycosides, may have higher selenium requirements, presumably because cyanide is released from the aglycone by glucosidase activity in the rumen and glutathione peroxidases is deactivated by the cyanide acting on the glutathione moiety. Neonate ruminants at risk of white muscle disease may be administered both selenium and vitamin E by injection; some of the WMD myopathies respond only to selenium, some only to vitamin E, and some to either.

Health effects

The effects of selenium intake on cancer have been studied in several clinical trials and epidemiologic studies in humans. Selenium may have a chemo-preventive role in cancer risk as an anti-oxidant, and it might trigger the immune response. At low levels, it is used in the body to create anti-oxidant selenoproteins, at higher doses than normal it causes cell death.

Selenium (in close interrelation with iodine) plays a role in thyroid health. Selenium is a cofactor for the three thyroid hormone deiodinases, helping activate and then deactivate various thyroid hormones and their metabolites. Isolated selenium deficiency is now being investigated for its role in induction autoimmune reactions in thyroid gland in Hashimoto's disease. However, in a case of combined iodine and selenium deficiency, selenium deficiency was shown to play a thyroid-protecting role.

See also

 Abundance of elements in Earth's crust
 ACES (nutritional supplement)
 Selenium yeast

Notes

References

External links

 Selenium at The Periodic Table of Videos (University of Nottingham)
 National Institutes of Health page on Selenium
 Assay 
 ATSDR – Toxicological Profile: Selenium
 CDC – NIOSH Pocket Guide to Chemical Hazards
 Peter van der Krogt elements site

 
Chemical elements
Chalcogens
Reactive nonmetals
Polyatomic nonmetals
Antioxidants
Dietary minerals
Native element minerals
Chemical elements with trigonal structure
Crystals in space group 152 or 154
Crystals in space group 14
Selene